David L. Hoffmann is a Distinguished Professor, an American historian, and an expert in Russian, Soviet, and East European history. His other interests include Environment, Health, Technology, and Science, as well as Power, Culture, and the State. Since 2017 he has been Arts and Sciences Distinguished Professor of History at the Ohio State University.

Education
B.A. in history, Lawrence University, (1983)
M.A. in Russian history, Columbia University, (1986)
Ph.D. in Russian history, Columbia University, (1990)

Books

Monographs
 (in progress) The Motherland Calls: War, Gender, and Memory in the Soviet Union, 1941-1991
The Stalinist Era (2018)
Forthcoming: Russian translation
Spanish translation: La Era de Stalin (2019)
Cultivating the Masses: Modern State Practices and Soviet Socialism, 1914-1939 (2011)
Stalinist Values: The Cultural Norms of Soviet Modernity, 1917-1941 (2003)
Peasant Metropolis: Social Identities in Moscow, 1929-1941 (1994) (Ohio Academy of History award for best book)

Edited Volumes 
Stalinism: The Essential Readings (2002)
Russian Modernity: Politics, Knowledge, Practices (2000)

Awards
Ohio State University Distinguished Teaching Award (2013)
Phi Alpha Theta Teaching Award (2010 and 2017)
Ohio Academy of History Book Award (1995)

References

Year of birth missing (living people)
Living people

Stalinism-era scholars and writers
Historians from Ohio
Ohio State University faculty
Columbia Graduate School of Arts and Sciences alumni
Lawrence University alumni